Buck & Buddy is an album by trumpeter Buck Clayton and saxophonist Buddy Tate which was recorded in 1960 and released on the Swingville label.

Reception

Scott Yanow of AllMusic states, "The melodic music consistently swings and practically defines "mainstream" jazz. Worth picking up".

Track listing
All compositions by Buck Clayton except where noted
 "High Life" – 5:25
 "When a Woman Loves a Man" (Bernie Hanighen, Gordon Jenkins, Johnny Mercer) – 5:34
 "Thou Swell" (Richard Rodgers, Lorenz Hart) – 5:14	
 "Can't We Be Friends?" (Paul James, Kay Swift) – 4:03
 "Birdland Betty" – 8:01
 "Kansas City Nights" – 5:42

Personnel
Buck Clayton – trumpet
Buddy Tate – tenor saxophone
Sir Charles Thompson – piano
Gene Ramey – bass
Mousie Alexander – drums

References

Buddy Tate albums
Buck Clayton albums
1961 albums
Swingville Records albums
Albums recorded at Van Gelder Studio
Albums produced by Esmond Edwards